Louis Hippolyte Marie Nouet (born September 5, 1844, in Quimper - died February 15, 1933, in Vannes) was Governor General for Inde française in the Second French Colonial Empire under Third Republic.

He was also Governor General for Nouvelle Calédonie from 1886 to 1888, for Martinique in 1890 and for Guadeloupe from 1891 to 1894.

Titles Held

French colonial governors and administrators
Governors of French India
French colonial governors of Guadeloupe
People of the French Third Republic
1844 births
1933 deaths